Bama is a local government area of Borno State, Nigeria. It has its headquarters in the town of Bama.

Landscape 
It has an area of 4,997 km2.

Population 
The population was recorded as 269,986 in the 2006 census.

Postal Code 
The postal code of the area is 610.

History 
It is located "about 60 kilometres (37 miles) from Maiduguri, the capital of Borno state".

It is one of the sixteen LGAs that constitute the Dikwa Emirate, a traditional state located in Borno State, Nigeria.

Insurgency Cases 
The town was attacked by Boko Haram in May 2013 and February 2014.
,
The two border towns of Bama and Gwoza have been cut off since the declaration of a state of emergency with soldiers blocking the roads linking the town to the state capital, Maiduguri ...  
Escapees from Bama were forced to take bush routes through Dikwa, a town 60km away from Bama and 150km from Maiduguri to get to the state capital.  
On September 2, 2014, Boko Haram seized control of Bama, according to the town's residents.

In December 2014, it was reported that "people too elderly to flee Gwoza Local Government Area were being rounded up and taken to two schools where the militants opened fire on them." Over 50 elderly people were killed. A "gory video" was released of insurgents shooting over a hundred civilians in a school dormitory in the town of Bama.

On 16 March 2015, the Nigerian army said that it had recaptured the city.

On 22 June 2016, the NGO Medicins Sans Frontiers (MSF) reported a "catastrophic humanitarian emergency" in a camp for refugees fleeing Boko Haram near the town of Bama. They stated that more than 1,200 people have died of starvation and illness at the camp. They also reported that between 23 May 2016 and 22 June 2016, at least 188 people have died at the camp (almost six per day), mainly from malnutrition and diarrhoea.

References

Local Government Areas in Borno State
Populated places in Borno State